Bellerose may refer to:

Bellerose, Queens, neighborhood in New York City
Bellerose, New York, adjacent village in Nassau County
Bellerose (LIRR station) 
Bellerose (actor), French actor in the early 17th century
Bellerose Belgium, clothing company